Brian McLaughlin (7 October 1954 – 13 August 2009) was a Scottish footballer who signed for Celtic from Linlithgow Rose before going on to play for Ayr United, Motherwell, Hamilton Academical and Falkirk. He signed for Hamilton Academical in January 1983 for a transfer fee of around £15,000 after having been made available for sale by his manager Jock Wallace. After his playing career ended, he was a member of St Mirren's coaching staff.

On 13 August 2009, McLaughlin was found dead in the Union Canal near Falkirk. Police said there did not appear to be any suspicious circumstances, and ruled his death accidental.

References

External links 
 Obituary at Ayr United F.C.

1954 births
2009 deaths
Accidental deaths in Scotland
Ayr United F.C. players
Celtic F.C. players
Deaths by drowning in the United Kingdom
Falkirk F.C. players
Association football wingers
Hamilton Academical F.C. players
Motherwell F.C. players
People from Grangemouth
Scottish expatriate footballers
Scottish expatriate sportspeople in Australia
Scottish footballers
Footballers from Falkirk (council area)
Finn Harps F.C. players
League of Ireland players
Expatriate association footballers in the Republic of Ireland
West Adelaide SC players
Expatriate soccer players in Australia